The following is a list of North Dakota State Auditors. The office has always been on a party affiliated ballot, and was a two-year term office until 1964. Since then, State Auditors have been elected to four-year terms.

See also
North Dakota State Auditor

Notes

External links
North Dakota State Auditor website

Auditors